Cahaba may refer to:

Places
 The Cahaba River in Alabama
 Cahaba River National Wildlife Refuge
 Cahaba River Wildlife Management Area
 Cahaba Basin, is a geologic area of central Alabama
 Cahaba, Alabama (or Cahawba), a ghost town in, and the former capital of, Alabama
 Cahaba Prison (or Cahawba Prison), a Confederate prison
 Cahawba County (see Bibb County, Alabama)
 Cahaba Heights, Vestavia Hills a neighborhood of Vestavia Hills, Jefferson County, Alabama, United States

Flora
 Cahaba lily, an aquatic, perennial flowering plant species
 Old Cahaba rosinweed, Silphium perplexum
 Cahaba torch, Liatris oligocephala

Fauna
 Cahaba shiner, a rare species of cyprinid fish
 Cahaba pebblesnail, a species of very small freshwater snail
 Cahawba elimia, a species of freshwater snail

Artifacts
 Cahaba, Marion and Greensboro Railroad
 USS Cahaba (AO-82), an Escambia-class replenishment oiler